The Bait Range is a small subrange of the Skeena Mountains of the Interior Mountains, located on the west side of northern Takla Lake in northern British Columbia, Canada.

Mountains
Mountains within the Bait Range include:

Bait Peak
Mount Lovel
Mount Teegee
Frypan Peak
Trail Peak

References

Bait Range in the Canadian Mountain Encyclopedia

Skeena Mountains